Paul Derek Zetland Thompson (born 17 April 1973) is an English retired footballer who played as a striker.

Thompson started his career with Redheugh Boys Club before signing for Hartlepool United in 1991. Thompson moved to non-league Gateshead in 1995, where he became the club's record goalscorer, scoring 130 goals in 439 total appearances during four stints at the club. He also had spells with Stevenage Borough, Bishop Auckland, Blyth Spartans & Whitley Bay.

From 2007 to 2010, Thompson was a coach at Gateshead, but left after the 2009–10 season as he was unable to commit to a full-time role for the following season.

Sources

References

External links

1973 births
Living people
English footballers
Association football forwards
Hartlepool United F.C. players
Gateshead F.C. players
Stevenage F.C. players
Bishop Auckland F.C. players
Blyth Spartans A.F.C. players
Whitley Bay F.C. players
English Football League players
National League (English football) players
Northern Premier League players
Northern Football League players
Gateshead F.C. non-playing staff